The 2016 New Hampshire Wildcats football team represented the University of New Hampshire in the 2016 NCAA Division I FCS football season. They were led by 18th-year head coach Sean McDonnell and played their home games at Wildcat Stadium. They were a member of the Colonial Athletic Association. They finished the season 8–5, 6–2 in CAA play to finish in a tie for second place. They received an at-large bid to the FCS Playoffs where they defeated Lehigh in the first round before losing in the second round to James Madison.

Schedule

Game summaries

at San Diego State

Holy Cross

at Dartmouth

at Rhode Island

William & Mary

at Elon

James Madison

at Towson

Stony Brook

Albany

at Maine

Lehigh—NCAA Division I First Round

James Madison–NCAA Division I Second Round

Ranking movements

References

New Hampshire
New Hampshire Wildcats football seasons
New Hampshire
New Hampshire Wildcats football